Fatehabad  is a town and a municipal council in Fatehabad district in the state of Haryana, India. It is administrative headquarter of Fatehabad district.

History

Fatehabad Fort, was built in 14th century CE by Firoz Shah Tughlaq and named after his son, also has tomb of Meershah Peer who was spiritual guide of Firoz Shah.

There is a mosque called Humayun's mosque, which has the 15 to 16 feet tall lower portion of an Ashokan pillar, topped with five inch marble strip, is called Ferozs Shah ki Lat and was likely taken from Agroha Mound and whose lower portion lies in Lat ki Masjid at hisar.

Geography

The geographical area of the district is 2520 km2. which is 5.4% of the state share.

Demographics

 India census, the Fatehabad Municipal Council has population of 70,777 of which 37,320 are males while 33,457 are females. Population of Children with age of 0-6 is 8263 which is 11.67% of total population of Fatehabad (M Cl). In Fatehabad Municipal Council, Female Sex Ratio is of 896 against state average of 879. Moreover Child Sex Ratio in Fatehabad is around 858 compared to Haryana state average of 834. Literacy rate of Fatehabad city is 81.96% higher than state average of 75.55%. In Fatehabad, Male literacy is around 86.86% while female literacy rate is 76.53%.

Religion

See also

 Haryana Tourism
 List of Monuments of National Importance in Haryana
 List of State Protected Monuments in Haryana
 List of Indus Valley Civilization sites in Haryana
 List of National Parks & Wildlife Sanctuaries of Haryana, India

References

External links
 Official Website of Fatehabad
 Official Website of Haryana Government for History

Forts in Haryana
Cities and towns in Fatehabad district